Hindi Broadcasters of the Hindi Service of Radio Ceylon.

D
Sunil Dutt

M

Manohar Mahajan

S

Shiv Kumar Saroj
Ameen Sayani

Radio Ceylon